Scarus falcipinnis is a species of fish of the Scaridae family in the order Perciformes.

Geographical distribution 
It is located in coastal waters of Oman, Mozambique, Seychelles, Mauritius, Reunion and Madagascar.

References

Bibliography 

 Fenner, Robert M.: The Conscientious Marine Aquarist. Neptune City, New Jersey, United States: T.F.H. Publications, 2001.
 Helfman, G., B. Collette and D. Facey: The diversity of fishes. Blackwell Science, Malden, Massachusetts, United States, 1997.
 Hoese, D.F. 1986. M.M. Smith and P.C. Heemstra (eds.) Smiths' sea fishes. Springer-Verlag, Berlin, Germany.
 Maugé, L.A. 1986. A J. Daget, J.-P. Gosse and D.F.E. Thys van den Audenaerde (eds.) Check-list of the freshwater fishes of Africa (CLOFFA). ISNB Brussels; MRAC, Tervuren, Flanders; and ORSTOM, Paris, France. Vol. 2.
 Moyle, P. and J. Cech.: Fishes: An Introduction to Ichthyology, 4th edition, Upper Saddle River, New Jersey, United States: Prentice-Hall. Year 2000.
 Nelson, J.: Fishes of the World, 3rd edition. New York City, United States: John Wiley and Sons. Year 1994.
 Wheeler, A.: The World Encyclopedia of Fishes, 2nd edition, London: Macdonald. Year 1985.

External links 

 ITIS
 AQUATAB.NET

falcipinnis
Fish described in 1868
Fish of the Indian Ocean